is a passenger railway station in the city of Sakuragawa, Ibaraki, Japan, operated by East Japan Railway Company (JR East).

Lines
Iwase Station is served by the Mito Line, and is located 29.6 km from the official starting point of the line at Oyama Station.

Station layout
The station consists of one side platform and one island platform, connected to the station building by a footbridge. The station is staffed

Platforms

History
Iwase Station was opened on 16 January 1889. From 1918 to 1987 it was also a terminal station for the now defunct Tsukuba Railway Tsukuba Line. The station was absorbed into the JR East network upon the privatization of the Japanese National Railways (JNR) on 1 April 1987.

Passenger statistics
In fiscal 2019, the station was used by an average of 918 passengers daily (boarding passengers only).

Surrounding area
former Iwase Town Hall
Iwase Post Office

See also
 List of railway stations in Japan

References

External links

 JR East Station Information 

Railway stations in Ibaraki Prefecture
Mito Line
Railway stations in Japan opened in 1889
Sakuragawa, Ibaraki